Darwen Cricket Club is a cricket club in the Lancashire League based at the Ainsworth Lord Estates Ground in Darwen, Lancashire. They are also known as 'The Towers'.

The club has played in the Ribblesdale League and were a founder member of the Northern Cricket League in 1952, joining the Lancashire League in 2017.

For the 2022 season the captain is Scott Friend.

History
A Darwen club played for a brief period in the Central Lancashire League and Ribblesdale League in the late 1800s before disbanding. The current team was founded as Darwen Etrurians Cricket Club in 1901. The club re-joined the Ribblesdale League in 1909, changing their name to Darwen Cricket Club in 1910. After sharing a ground at Barley Bank, the former home of Darwen FC, the club moved to their present ground at Birch Hall in 1920. They switched to the Northern League for its inaugural season in 1952.

From start of the 2017 season Darwen, along with Clitheroe and Great Harwood, moved to the Lancashire League. The club had a successful first campaign with the first XI finishing the season as runners-up in the league and winning the Worsley Cup.

In September 2018 Darwen were crowned the county's club champions after beating Clifton CC in the LCF Knockout Cup.

On 4th September 2022, the club completed the full set of county honours when defeating Greenmount CC by 13 runs to become Lancashire League Champions.

Honours
Ribblesdale League
1st XI League Winners - 3 - 1922, 1934, 1940 (shared).

Northern League
1st XI League Winners - 5 - 1966, 1987, 1999, 2002, 2004.
1st XI League (Division Two) Winners - 2 - 1959, 1966.

Lancashire League
1st XI League Winners - 1 - 2022.
1st XI Holland Cup Winners - 2 - 2017, 2021.
T20 Competition Winners - 1 - 2021.
Worsley Cup Winners - 2 - 2017, 2019.
Ron Singleton Colne Trophy Winners - 1 - 2018 (shared).
2nd XI League Winners - 1 - 2018.
2nd XI (Lancashire Telegraph) Cup Winners - 1 - 2018.

Notable players
Atif Ashraf.
Tom Dewdney.
Robert Entwistle.
Scott Hookey.
Siddhesh Lad.
Ken Rickards.
Keith Semple.
Ken Snellgrove.
David Wiese.

References

Lancashire League cricket clubs
Sport in Blackburn with Darwen
1901 establishments in England
Cricket clubs established in 1901